USS Monomoy (AG-40) was a commercial cargo ship acquired by the U.S. Navy during World War II. She was outfitted with guns and depth charges and sent into the dangerous waters of the North Atlantic Ocean to furnish data used to predict storm movement and severe weather conditions to safeguard the continuous movement of merchant convoys, naval warships, and airplanes between North America and the United Kingdom, Murmansk, and other destinations.  She served  as an escort vessel when required. She was manned by a U.S. Coast Guard crew and was eventually transferred to that agency as USCGC Monomoy (WAG-275).

Built in Duluth, Minnesota 
Monomoy (AG-40) was built in 1918 by Globe Shipbuilding Co., Duluth, Minnesota; acquired as J. Floyd Massey, Jr 15 September 1941 from Steel Products Transportation Company, Buffalo, New York; renamed Monomoy 15 October 1941; and commissioned 24 December 1941.

World War II Navy service 
Monomoy, manned and operated by the U.S. Coast Guard, joined the Weather Patrol, U.S. Atlantic Fleet, in 1942. From her base at Boston, Massachusetts, she periodically sailed to weather stations 1 and 2, where she provided weather reports vital for the safety of convoys and air commerce.

Operating in dangerous waters, she made frequent contact with enemy submarines. At 9:07 PM on 24 July 1942 after spotting wake from two torpedoes crossing ten yards off the bow, the Officer of the Deck (Albert L. Preston) spotted a U-Boat periscope and conning tower.  Four shots were fired from the 4" gun at 9:09 PM.  The second, targeted at 2,000 yards, resulted in a metallic thud and a fire at the location of the U-Boat, which then disappeared from view. Two more shots were fired, followed by depth charges.  No survivors were seen.

She continued patrolling the North Atlantic, the North Sea, and the Bay of Biscay for the next 15 months.  At times it took two men to control the ship's wheel in the rough seas.  The ship rendered valuable service to Allied ships and planes in the North Atlantic.

Transferred to the Coast Guard 
She was formally transferred to the Coast Guard 22 October 1943, and stricken from the Naval Register 30 October. Redesignated WAG-275, Monomoy served the Coast Guard through the remainder of the war and was then transferred to the U.S. Maritime Commission. She was scrapped in 1951.

References 

 
 
 Background information obtained from NARA I (National Archives and Records Administration) file: USCGC Monomoy, which includes the ship's log, letters, and special reports written by officers on board.

Ships built in Duluth, Minnesota
Steamships of the United States Navy
World War II patrol vessels of the United States
Ships of the United States Coast Guard
1918 ships
Lake ships
Ships transferred from the United States Navy to the United States Coast Guard